Rebecca Naomi Jones (born March 31, 1981) is an American actress and singer best known for her performances in the Broadway rock musicals Passing Strange, American Idiot, and Hedwig and the Angry Inch as well as being the first woman of color to play Laurey in Oklahoma! on Broadway. She also starred more recently in New York City’s Shakespere in the park adaptation of As You Like It.

Life and career
Jones was born in New York City, New York, to a musician father and photographer mother. Her mother is Jewish and her father is African-American. Jones performed in the children's chorus of the Metropolitan Opera as a child and graduated from the Berkeley Carroll School in 1999. "I did theatre all throughout middle school and high school and was really into it, the same with singing", she said. Jones received her BFA in drama from the University of North Carolina School of the Arts and appeared in the national tours of Rent and Caroline, or Change.

In 2007 Jones made her Off-Broadway debut in Passing Strange, which transferred to Broadway on February 28, 2008. She originated the role of Whatsername in the Green Day rock opera American Idiot, which opened on Broadway on April 20, 2010. Paper magazine said of Jones, "She's carved out a nice niche for herself as the girl to call when there's a cooler-than-thou musical in town."

In 2012 Jones played the Narrator in Manhattan Theatre Club's Off-Broadway musical Murder Ballad, for which she received a Lucille Lortel Award nomination for Outstanding Featured Actress. Jones returned for the show's engagement at the Union Square Theatre, which ran from May 22, 2013, to July 21, 2013. Later that summer, Jones appeared as Jaquenetta in a new musical adaptation of Love's Labour's Lost at Central Park's Delacorte Theater.

On June 2, 2014, Jones received a Lilly Award, a prize honoring women in the theater.

On April 14, 2015, Jones replaced Lena Hall as Yitzhak in the Broadway production of Hedwig and the Angry Inch. Jones played the role through the production's end on September 13.

In 2017 she starred as Vanessa in Significant Other on Broadway.

In 2018 Jones starred as Laurey Williams in Daniel Fish's production of Oklahoma! at St. Ann's Warehouse. The production transferred to Broadway at the Circle in the Square Theatre in March 2019.

Filmography

Film

Television

Theatre

Awards and nominations

References

External links
 
 
 
 

1981 births
Living people
21st-century American actresses
African-American actresses
American women singers
American stage actresses
American musical theatre actresses
Actresses from New York City
Singers from New York City
University of North Carolina School of the Arts alumni
20th-century African-American women singers
21st-century African-American women
21st-century African-American people